René Frémin (1 October 1672 - 17 February 1744) was a French sculptor.

Frémin studied at the Académie royale de peinture et de sculpture (Royal Academy of Painting and Sculpture), where he was a pupil of François Girardon and Antoine Coysevox. In 1694 he won the Prix de Rome for sculpture. He stayed in Rome from 1695 to 1699. Returning to France, he produced sculptures for the park of Rambouillet and the Hall of Mirrors at the Palace of Versailles. He was also responsible for the decoration of the facade of the building housing La Samaritaine department store on the Pont Neuf in Paris.

From 1721 to 1738, Frémin worked in Madrid, where King Philip V of Spain commissioned the decoration of the Royal Palace of La Granja de San Ildefonso.

References
 Souchal, François, French Sculptors of the 17th and 18th Centuries. The Reign of Louis XIV. (Oxford: Oxford University Press), 1981. Vol. I. A-F, s.v. "René Frémin"

External links
 

1672 births
1744 deaths
17th-century French sculptors
French male sculptors
18th-century French sculptors
People from Troyes
Prix de Rome for sculpture
18th-century French male artists